Blackout is the third studio album by American rock band Hed PE. Released on March 18, 2003, Blackout peaked at number 33 on the Billboard 200,  selling 28,000 copies in its first week, while its title track peaked at number 21 on the Hot Mainstream Rock Tracks chart and at number 32 on the Hot Modern Rock Tracks chart. A second single, "Other Side", peaked at number 40 on the Hot Mainstream Rock Tracks chart. The album also peaked at number 102 in the United Kingdom. The song "Get Away" is featured in NASCAR Thunder 2003 produced by EA Sports. Sonny Mayo is credited playing guitar, but didn't play according to an interview with Good Company.
This is the last release by the band to have two Guitarists, after Chizad quit in 2002.

Production

Jared Gomes later reflected unfavorably on the album's production, claiming that the label was trying to achieve commercial success by forcing a nu metal sound. Gomes stated in 2011, "all my decisions were being overlooked by the record company I was under when producing it… causing me to hold back on things, change song structures and all other kinds of shit in order to try and get into the radio friendly scene to fit in with the nu-metal movement… and as I complied I grew to dislike what I was becoming." Eventually, Gomes said, he would try to make the band's next album, Only in Amerika as uncommercial as possible, to provoke people lyrically as a backlash against the more commercial sound of Blackout.

Reception 

Allmusic's Johnny Loftus wrote that "While it expands on melodic elements that had previously played a supporting role in the band's sound, Blackout also delivers truckloads of crushing guitar and pounding rhythm. And whether or not it is the presence of a top-line producer, (hed) pe have figured out a way to imbue their aggressive mix of heavy rock and hip-hop with some serious hooks."

Legacy
Beatdust described the band as "becoming another Limp Bizkit clone" with Blackout and the previous album Broke, which were recorded to pay back the losses owed to the label to recoup the commercial failure of the band's 1997 self-titled debut album. Jared Gomes has dismissed the album as "corporate junk".

Track listing

Personnel

(hed) Planet Earth
Jahred Gomes – vocals, lyrics
Wesstyle – guitar
Doug «DJ Product 1969 ©» Boyce – turntables
Mark «Mawk» Young – bass
Ben C. Vaught – drums

Production
Produced by Machine, Steve Thompson (8) & Mike Bradford (9)
Engineered by Machine, Krish Sharma, John Goodmanson (8), Dan Leffler, Jason Kohlmann, Darrell Harvey, Matthew Marti, Chris Ohno & Joey Paradise
Mixed by Steve Thompson, John Goodmanson, Jason Vescio & Paul Smith, at Skip Saylor Recording, Los Angeles / Rich Costey, Darren Mora & Dan Leffler (4, 8, 10), at Cello Studios, Hollywood, California
Mastered by Ted Jensen, at Sterling Sound, New York City
Arranged by Steve Thompson (8)
Additional guitar by Chad Benekos
Programming by Machine, Wes Geer & Mark Young
Sound design & additional programming by Clinton Bradley
Management by Shannon O'Shea (SOS Management), Rick Sales & Kristen Mulderig (Sanctuary Artist Management)
Manufactured by Zomba Recording Corporation
Photo by Andrew MacNaughtan
Art direction & design by Elisa Garcia
Cover art by Axis

References 

2003 albums
Hed PE albums
Jive Records albums
Albums produced by Michael Bradford